Hypolycaena nigra, the black fairy hairstreak, is a butterfly in the family Lycaenidae. It was described by George Bethune-Baker in 1914. It is found in Sierra Leone, Liberia, Ivory Coast, Ghana, Nigeria (south and the Cross River loop), Cameroon, Gabon, the Republic of the Congo, the Central African Republic, the Democratic Republic of the Congo (Mongala, Uele, Ituri, Kivu, Tshopo, Tshuapa, Sankuru and Lualaba), Uganda and north-western Tanzania. The habitat consists of forests.

The larvae are associated with the ant species Pheidole aurivillii race kasaiensis. They are soft, green and onisciform (woodlouse shaped).

References

External links
Die Gross-Schmetterlinge der Erde 13: Die Afrikanischen Tagfalter. Plate XIII 68 b

Butterflies described in 1914
Hypolycaenini